William "Bud" Cauley (born March 16, 1990) is an American professional golfer.

Amateur career
Cauley was born in Daytona Beach, Florida where he was home schooled by his parents. He was ranked top-five nationally in junior golf and among top 15 in the world. As a junior golfer, Cauley was a member of the 2006 Junior Ryder Cup, and the 2008 USA Junior World Golf Championships team. He was also a co-medalist at the 2008 Toyota World Junior Amateur Championships. When Cauley moved up to amateur events he was ranked No. 1 in junior golf.

Cauley chose to play college golf for the University of Alabama golf team, where he became one of the best in the program's history. He was a three-time first-team Golfweek All-American during his three years at Alabama. He was also a finalist for the Hogan Award, given to the best college golfer, all three years at Alabama. Cauley was a member of the 2009 U.S. Walker Cup team, where he posted a 3-0-1 record. In 2009, Cauley was the Southeastern Conference's Freshman of the Year. That year he captured his first collegiate victory at the United States Collegiate Championship. In 2008 he won the Players Amateur, qualifying him for the 2010 Verizon Heritage on the PGA Tour. He played in the 2009 and 2010 U.S. Amateur; in 2009 Cauley beat the world's No. 1 amateur, Rickie Fowler, in the first round of match play. He also won the Terra Cotta Invitational in 2008.

Professional career
After finishing his junior year at Alabama, Cauley qualified for the 2011 U.S. Open and decided to turn professional, foregoing his senior season. Cauley did not miss a cut in the first four PGA Tour events he played, which included a T4 at the Viking Classic. He also finished T4 at the Nationwide Tour's Utah Championship. Cauley made the cut at the 2011 U.S. Open, finishing T63 and guaranteeing a bypass to the second stage of Q School.

Cauley also finished third at the 2011 Frys.com Open, earning $340,000. In 2011, Cauley earned $735,150 in eight PGA Tour starts. He finished the equivalent of 116th on the 2011 money list, joining Gary Hallberg, Scott Verplank, Phil Mickelson, Justin Leonard, Ryan Moore, and Tiger Woods as those who avoided Q school and went directly to the PGA Tour after college.

In 2012, Cauley's had four top-10 finishes; he was in the top 100 in the Official World Golf Ranking by the end of July of that year.

In 2013, Cauley made only 10 cuts in 24 events. He played in the Web.com Tour Finals and finished 18th to retain his PGA Tour card for 2014.

Professional wins (1)

Web.com Tour wins (1)

Results in major championships
Results not in chronological order in 2020.

CUT = missed the half-way cut
"T" = tied for place
NT = No tournament due to COVID-19 pandemic

Results in The Players Championship

CUT = missed the halfway cut
"T" indicates a tie for a place

U.S. national team appearances
Amateur
 Junior Ryder Cup: 2006
Palmer Cup: 2009
Walker Cup: 2009 (winners)

See also
2013 Web.com Tour Finals graduates
2014 Web.com Tour Finals graduates

References

External links

Profile on University of Alabama's official site

American male golfers
Alabama Crimson Tide men's golfers
PGA Tour golfers
Korn Ferry Tour graduates
Golfers from Jacksonville, Florida
Sportspeople from Daytona Beach, Florida
People from Hobe Sound, Florida
1990 births
Living people